King's Bounty: Legions is a social, turn-based strategy video game developed jointly by Nival and KranX Productions. It is based on the strategy game King's Bounty: The Legend, which is itself based on concepts from the much older King's Bounty developed in 1990 by New World Computing. It is currently available to play on Facebook, iPad, Windows Phone as well Android devices.

Gameplay
The player controls a party of up to five unit groups, each group containing between 1 and several hundred identical units, chosen among about 50 different types (e.g. druids, knights, pirates, black unicorns, dark griffins, etc.). The units come from 4 different "realms" (Kingdom, Chaos, Ancients, and Beasts) and belong to one of 5 different classes (Warriors, Defenders, Magicians, Archers, and Healers). Unit characteristics are reminiscent of the old New World Computing "King's Bounty" and "Heroes of Might and Magic" franchises. The gameplay switches between an overland map where the player's party travels between "villages" following "quests", and a hex-based tactical combat map. In the overland map the main plot is fairly linear and relatively short. Aside from the main quest, there are some special quests and each village (there are about 25 of them) also offers a "daily quest". However, all the quests are resolved through combat (no riddles, puzzles or anything). One can thus say that the overland map is mostly an excuse to initiate combat. Tactical combat mechanics are very similar to long known mechanics (e.g. Heroes of Might and Magic), although arguably simpler.

Equipment offers an interesting strategic dimension as defeated units leave various items behind, which can be combined into other items and ultimately serve to craft equipment for the player's party (helmet, weapon, armour, boots, shield, belt, etc.). Since the primary items one has at his disposal are in limited quantities, what pieces of equipment are best crafted will depend on the composition of ones' party (spending precious resources on crafting an "assassin's knife" might not be the best choice if you don't enroll assassins in your party).

Aside from the solo play, there are also two types of "player vs. player" battles (one where the army is assembled by another player but controlled by the computer and a genuine "duel") which greatly extend the life and replayability of the game. To Nival's/1C credit, the game is about as well-balanced as one can hope, and player vs. player remains relatively interesting even for players that choose not to spend a fortune on in-game goodies and upgrades.

References

External links
 Official website

2011 video games
Android (operating system) games
Browser games
Facebook games
IOS games
Massively multiplayer online turn-based strategy games
Video game sequels
Video games developed in Russia
Windows Phone games